Pinball Expo is an event that is held annually in the Chicago area, the original home of most pinball manufacturers. The event attracts pinball industry professionals, pinball players, collectors, and enthusiasts from around the world. Founded by Robert "Rob" Berk, of Warren, Ohio, the event was inaugurated over the weekend of November 22–24, 1985 at the Holiday Inn O'Hare/Kennedy in Rosemont, IL. At the 33rd Pinball Expo, on Saturday, October 14, 2017, Twin Galaxies founder Walter Day made a presentation on behalf of Guinness World Records, issuing a Guinness award that recognized The Pinball Expo as history's "longest-running pinball event."

Development
Founded in 1985, Pinball Expo is the longest-running event dedicated to pinball. It was conceived in 1984 by Robert "Rob" Berk of Warren, Ohio, with the purpose of honoring his heroes of the pinball industry; the artists and designers. With the assistance of Bill Kurtz of Cleveland, Ohio, and later Mike Pacak of Canfield, Ohio, the trio held their first event over the weekend of November 22–24, 1985 at the Holiday Inn O'Hare/Kennedy in Rosemont, Illinois. The inaugural event attracted around 100 attendees from all parts of the world and a dozen vendors.

The expo offers a tour of a pinball factory, an autograph session, tournaments, and an exhibit hall of pinball machines and related paraphernalia. There are seminars featuring well-known pinball experts. Attendees can also participate in a pinball tournament called "Flip Out".

On October 26, 1991, the Pinball Expo launched the Pinball Expo Hall of Fame and inducted its first class of pinball luminaries: David Gottlieb, Ray Moloney, Sam Stern, and Harry E. Williams. The event is open to the general public.

By 1998, the Expo had grown to feature more than 200 machines available to play on the show floor.

Pinball World Premieres held at the Pinball Expo
As one of the most prestigious pinball events in the world, the Pinball Expo has been chosen by many pinball manufacturers as the site for official "world premieres" of new pinball titles. Among the games released at the Pinball Expo are:

Chronology of Annual Pinball Expos

Pinball Expo Hall of Fame 
As early as Pinball Expo '88, Rob Berk was championing the idea of a Pinball Expo Hall of Fame. In 1991 the Hall of Fame was created with the induction of Harry E. Williams, Sam Stern, Ray Moloney and David Gottlieb.

Pinball Expo Service and Support Hall of Fame 
The Pinball Expo Service and Support Hall of Fame was established at the 2014 Expo to recognize individuals and organizations who have made significant contributions to the hobby of pinball.

References

Pinball
Electronic games
Gaming conventions